AFL Mackay is an amateur Australian rules football competition formed as the Mackay Australian Football League in 1970. It is headquartered in the city of Mackay with further clubs in Airlie Beach, Sarina, Alligator Creek, Pioneer Valley and Moranbah. The representative team is known as the Crows. The Premier division is now sponsored by Allied Pickfords Australia (renaming it to Allied Pickfords Cup)

History
The first Australian rules football matches in Mackay were held in 1885, however most clubs in the region later adopted rugby rules. It would be almost a century before regular competition would again be played in the region.

The Mackay Australian Football League began in 1970 with founding clubs being the East Mackay Demons, West Mackay Magpies (later Walkerston), and North Mackay Colts.
1971 Bakers Creek join.
1975 Moranbah joined and stayed until 1982 when they returned to the central highland due to work commitments.  
1977 Mackay City joined the competition.
1980 Dysart joined.
1982 Middlemount joined.  Dysart and Middlemount along with Moranbah returned the central highlands as shift work was being the killer for the teams.  
1983 There came a break away from the North Mackay team and they called themselves Trend United. 
1985 Airlie Beach came into the competition.  They changed their name to Whitsunday in 1990.  
1987 East Mackay and Trend United amalgamated to become known as Eastern Swans.  
1989 Moranbah came back but the same problems arose, shift work and in 1993 again returned to the central highlands. 
1990 Mackay City changed their name to Northern Beaches and then back to Mackay City in 1998.
2011 Andergrove Kangaroos joined the competition, changed their name to the Northern Beaches Magpies in 2012, and then to the Mackay Magpies in 2015.

MJ Miller Medal 
The MJ Miller Medal is awarded to the best & fairest player as voted by the umpires in the senior men's competition. The award is named after Mick Miller; formerly of the Walkerston Magpies, who was a driving force behind the introduction of AFL to the Mackay Region.

Previous Winners:

 1970 Dave Synnott (North Mackay)
 1971 
 1972 
 1973
 1974 Frank Zeolla (North Mackay)
 1975
 1976
 1977
 1978
 1979
 1980
 1981
 1982
 1983
 1984
 1985
 1986
 1987
 1988
 1989

 1990
 1991
 1992
 1993
 1994
 1995
 1996
 1997 Peter Morris (North Mackay Saints)
 1998 Robert Wells (Northern Beaches Lions)
 1999
 2000
 2001
 2002
 2003
 2004 Tyrone Kovacs (Whitsunday Sea Eagles)
 2005
 2006 John Price (North Mackay Saints)
 2007 John Price (North Mackay Saints)
 2008 John Price (North Mackay Saints)
 2009

 2010 Desmond Hayes (Mackay City Hawks)
 2011 Heath Thiele (Andergrove Kangaroos)
 2012
 2013 Blake Miles (North Mackay Saints)
 2014 Nathan Peters (North Mackay Saints)
 2015 Desmond Hayes (Mackay City Hawks)
 2016
 2017 James Gallagher (North Mackay Saints)
 2018 Cameron Hill (North Mackay Saints)
 2019 Darcy Mealy (Eastern Swans)
 2020 Braeden Ebert (Mackay Magpies)
 2021 Alec Townsend (North Mackay Saints)
 2022 David Manning (Eastern Swans)

Premiers

 1970 East Mackay
 1971 Bakers Creek
 1972 Bakers Creek
 1973 East Mackay
 1974 North Mackay
 1975 Walkerston
 1976 North Mackay
 1977 Moranbah
 1978 Moranbah
 1979 Bakers Creek
 1980 East Mackay
 1981 Bakers Creek
 1982 Mackay City
 1983 North Mackay
 1984 Trend United
 1985 Mackay City
 1986 Mackay City

 1987 North Mackay
 1988 Eastern Swans
 1989 Bakers Creek
 1990 Bakers Creek
 1991 Bakers Creek
 1992 Bakers Creek
 1993 Whitsunday
 1994 Whitsunday
 1995 Whitsunday
 1996 Whitsunday
 1997 Northern Beaches
 1998 Eastern Swans
 1999 Bakers Creek
 2000 Mackay City
 2001 North Mackay
 2002 North Mackay
 2003 North Mackay

 2004 Whitsunday
 2005 Whitsunday
 2006 Whitsunday
 2007 North Mackay
 2008 North Mackay
 2009 Eastern Swans
 2010 Whitsunday
 2011 Mackay City
 2012 Mackay City
 2013 Mackay City
 2014 Moranbah
 2015 Eastern Swans
 2016 Mackay City Hawks
 2017 Whitsunday
 2018 Whitsunday
 2019 North Mackay
 2020 North Mackay
 2021 North Mackay
 2022 North Mackay

Clubs

Former

Senior Mens Leading Goal Kickers

2008 Ladder

2009 Ladder

2010 Ladder

2011 Ladder

2012 Ladder

2013 Ladder

2014 Ladder

See also

Australian Rules football in Queensland

League
Official AFL Mackay Website

External links

Australian rules football competitions in Queensland
Sport in Mackay, Queensland
1970 establishments in Australia